Houshayu station is a station on Line 15 of the Beijing Subway. The station was the eastern terminus of Line 15 until it was extended eastward to Fengbo on December 31, 2011.

Station Layout 
The station has an elevated island platform.

Exits 
There are 4 exits, lettered A, B, C, and D. Exits A and B are accessible.

References

External links 

Beijing Subway stations in Shunyi District
Railway stations in China opened in 2010